Boris Andreyevich Grishayev  (25 February 1925 – 1999) was a Russian marathon runner. In 1954 he won the Soviet title and placed second at the European Championships. He competed at the 1956 Summer Olympics but failed to finish.

References

External links
Biography of Boris Grishayev 

1925 births
1999 deaths
Russian male long-distance runners
Soviet male long-distance runners
Place of birth missing
Olympic athletes of the Soviet Union
Athletes (track and field) at the 1956 Summer Olympics
European Athletics Championships medalists
Sportspeople from Volgograd